Strážné is a municipality and village in Trutnov District in the Hradec Králové Region of the Czech Republic. It has about 200 inhabitants.

Geography
It lies in the Giant Mountains and in the Krkonoše National Park. The Malé Labe River springs near the northern municipal border, forms part of the municipal border, and then flows across the municipality.

History

The iron ore was mined in the area probably already in the 15th century, and in the 16th century, mining was at its peak. However, a settlement was founded here later. The first written mention Strážné is from 1754, that time under the name Pommerndorf. According to legends, it was founded by exiled people from Pomerania during the Thirty Years' War. The area of today's Strážné also included the village of Herlíkovice.

In 1792, the mining stopped. The source of livelihood then became forestry, cattle breeding and textile industry. Since the 19th century, tourism is developing. In 1945, the German population was expelled and the area significantly depopulated. Therefore, in 1951 Herlíkovice was abolished, and its territory was divided between Strážné and Vrchlabí.

Sport
There is a ski resort with four ski slopes.

Sights
The Art Nouveau building of the Evangelical church in the former village of Herlíkovice dates from 1904.

Notable people
Johann Lahr (1913–1942), ski jumper

References

External links

Villages in Trutnov District